The Mineral Range Railroad (reporting mark MRA) is a shortline railroad in the Upper Peninsula of Michigan. It began operations in 2012 on an ex-Lake Superior and Ishpeming line between Humboldt Mine and Ishpeming.

The Humboldt Mine opened in 2014 and is operated by Eagle Mine, owned by Lundin Mining. At the site there is also a mill, the Humboldt Mill. It was opened in 1954 by Cleveland-Cliffs Inc, who operated it until 1979. Between 1985 to 1990, Callahan Mining Company used it to process gold from the Ropes Gold Mine in Ishpeming, Michigan. After several changes in ownership, Eagle Mine started to use it for nickel and copper extraction in 2014.

Traffic on the Mineral Range Railroad primarily consists of nickel and copper ore concentrates.

References

Michigan railroads
Railway companies established in 2012

External links